The NECC men's basketball tournament is the annual conference basketball championship tournament for the NCAA Division III New England Collegiate Conference. The tournament has been held annually since 2009. It is a single-elimination tournament and seeding is based on regular season records.

As conference champion, the winner receives the NECC's automatic bid to the NCAA Men's Division III Basketball Championship.

Results

Championship records

 Schools highlighted in pink are former members of the NECC, as of the next NCAA basketball season in 2021–22.
 Lesley has not yet qualified for the tournament finals.
 Daniel Webster, Dean, and Wheelock never qualified for the finals as NECC members

References

NCAA Division III men's basketball conference tournaments
Basketball Tournament, Men's
Recurring sporting events established in 2009